The Back Campus Fields is a field hockey facility on the St. George Campus of the University of Toronto in Toronto, Ontario, Canada. The facility is the home to the school's Toronto Varsity Blues field hockey team.  The facility was built for the 2015 Pan American Games and hosted the field hockey competition for the games. The facility also hosted 5 and 7-a-side football competitions during the 2015 Parapan American Games. The facility was referred to as the Pan Am/Parapan Am Fields during the games.

Development

Re-construction of the fields began in July 2013 and was completed in 2014, one year before the games were scheduled to start. The complex was built on the existing back campus grass rugby pitch between University College and Hoskin Avenue. 

The facility consists of two International Hockey Federation (FIH) Global Class 1 fields; one being used for practices and warm-ups during the games while the other was used for competition matches. Temporary seating for 2,000 spectators was also installed for the games. 

The facility cost $9.5 million, which includes $6.25 million to build and finance the project. "The remainder comprises capital expenditures for equipment, transaction fees, project management and other ancillary costs".

Major competitions hosted

See also
Venues of the 2015 Pan American and Parapan American Games

References

External links
 University of Toronto Back Campus Fields Page
 Toronto 2015 - Pan Am / Parapan Am Fields Page

Sports venues in Toronto
Field hockey venues in Canada
University of Toronto buildings
University sports venues in Canada
Venues of the 2015 Pan American Games
Venues of the 2015 Parapan American Games
2014 establishments in Ontario
Sports venues completed in 2014
Soccer venues in Canada
Public–private partnership projects in Canada